Raysa Sánchez (born 6 May 1988 in Santo Domingo, Dominican Republic) is a Dominican sprinter who specializes in the 400 metres. She represented the Dominican Republic at the 2012 Summer Olympics. Raysa resides in the city of San Germán, Puerto Rico where she runs for the Intermerican University of Puerto Rico. She holds the 400 m race record in Puerto Rico's university athletic league (LAI = Liga Atlética Interuniversitaria). She also holds the Dominican Republic record for the same race.

References 

Sportspeople from Santo Domingo
1988 births
Living people
Dominican Republic female sprinters
Athletes (track and field) at the 2012 Summer Olympics
Olympic athletes of the Dominican Republic
Olympic female sprinters